The 1993–94 League Cup was the twenty-third season of the rugby league League Cup, known as the Regal Trophy due to sponsorship by Regal.

Castleford won the final, beating the pre-match favourites Wigan by the score of 33-2. The match was played at Headingley, Leeds in front of an attendance of 15,626.

Background 
This season saw virtually a complete re-vamping of the  competition for instance; The Preliminary round was renamed "First Round", with every other succeeding round being renamed. The (newly named) First Round now consisted of 16 matches involving 32 clubs, with a further 16 clubs being given byes into the Second Round. The number of entrants was further increased by inviting eleven of the top junior clubs. The  inclusion of two French clubs continued with the inclusion of AS Saint Estève. The sixteen First Round winners added to the  sixteen clubs given byes, gave a total of entrants into the  second round as thirty-two. There were no drawn matches in the competition this season.

Competition and results

Round 1 - First Round - (a Preliminary Round) 

Involved  16 matches and 32 clubs, with 16 byes

Round 2  Second  Round 

Involved  16 matches and 32 Clubs

Round 3 - Third  Round 

Involved  8 matches and 16 Clubs

Round 4 -Quarter Finals 

Involved 4 matches with 8 clubs

Round 5 – Semi-Finals 

Involved 2 matches and 4 Clubs

Final

Teams and scorers 

Scoring - Try = four points - Goal = two points - Drop goal = one point

Prize money 
As part of the sponsorship deal and funds, the  prize money awarded to the competing teams for this season is as follows:-

The road to success 
This tree excludes the First Round fixtures

Notes and comments 
1 * West Bowling are a junior (or amateur) club from Bradford
2 * Leigh Miners' Welfare are a Junior (amateur) club from Leigh (formed by merger of Astley & Tyldesley and Hope Rangers - and now Leigh Miners Rangers)
3 * Queens are a Junior (amateur) club from Leeds
4 * Woolston Rovers are a Junior (amateur) club from Warrington, becoming Warrington Woolston Rovers in 2003 and Warrington Wizards in 2002. the ground is the old Warrington Home Ground of Wilderspool 
5 * Carcassonne played in the French League at Stade Albert Domec
6 * Myson are a Junior (amateur) club from Hull
7 * Ellenborough Rangers are a Junior (amateur) club from the Ellenborough suburb of Maryport, Cumbria
8 * Irlam Hornets ARLFC are a junior club from Irlam, Salford, playing at Cutnook Lane
9 * Wigan official archives gives the club name as Nottingham Borough. There appear to be no other references anywhere to this name and assume it is an misprint
10 * AS Saint Estève was a French rugby league team from Perpignan, which in 2000 it merged with nearby neighbours XIII Catalan to form Union Treiziste Catalaneto compete in the Super Leagueas the Catalans Dragons.
11 * Hemel Stags are a semi professional club based in Hemel Hempstead and playing at the Pennine Way stadium (capacity 2000)
12 * Saddleworth Rangers are a Junior (amateur) club from Oldham
13 * Egremont are a Junior (amateur) club from Cumbria
14 * Wigan St Patricks are a Junior (amateur) club from Wigan
15 * RUGBYLEAGUEproject gives the attendance as 851 but Hull official archives gives it as 819
16 * RUGBYLEAGUEproject gives the attendance as 5,185 but Wigan official archives gives it as 5,128
17 * RUGBYLEAGUEproject gives the attendance as 3,075 but Widnes official archives gives it as 3,074
18 * RUGBYLEAGUEproject and Widnes official archives gives the attendance as 3,412 but Hull official archives gives it as 3,421
19 * RUGBYLEAGUEproject gives the attendance as 6,342 but Wigan official archives gives it as 6,500
20 * Wigan official archives - special details give this as the third round, obviously a mis-print
21 * RUGBYLEAGUEproject gives the attendance as 7,321 but Wigan official archives gives it as 7,231
22 * RUGBYLEAGUEproject and Wigan official archives gives the score as 26-6 but Hull official archives gives it as 24-6
23  * Headingley, Leeds, is the home ground of Leeds RLFC with a capacity of 21,000. The record attendance was  40,175 for a league match between Leeds and Bradford Northern on 21 May 1947.

General information for those unfamiliar 
The council of the Rugby Football League voted to introduce a new competition, to be similar to The Football Association and Scottish Football Association's "League Cup". It was to be a similar knock-out structure to, and to be secondary to, the Challenge Cup. As this was being formulated, sports sponsorship was becoming more prevalent and as a result John Player and Sons, a division of Imperial Tobacco Company, became sponsors, and the competition never became widely known as the "League Cup" 
The competition ran from 1971-72 until 1995-96 and was initially intended for the professional clubs plus the two amateur BARLA National Cup finalists. In later seasons the entries were expanded to take in other amateur and French teams. The competition was dropped due to "fixture congestion" when Rugby League became a summer sport
The Rugby League season always (until the onset of "Summer Rugby" in 1996) ran from around August-time through to around May-time and this competition always took place early in the season, in the Autumn, with the final usually taking place in late January 
The competition was variably known, by its sponsorship name, as the Player's No.6 Trophy (1971–1977), the John Player Trophy (1977–1983), the John Player Special Trophy (1983–1989), and the Regal Trophy in 1989.

See also 
1993-94 Rugby Football League season
Regal Trophy
Rugby league county cups

References

External links
Saints Heritage Society
1896–97 Northern Rugby Football Union season at wigan.rlfans.com 
Hull&Proud Fixtures & Results 1896/1897
Widnes Vikings - One team, one passion Season In Review - 1896-97
The Northern Union at warringtonwolves.org
Huddersfield R L Heritage
Wakefield until I die

League Cup (rugby league)
League Cup
League Cup
League Cup
League Cup